Dr. Ernst Fuhrmann (21 October 1918 – 6 February 1995) was chairman of Porsche AG between 1972 and 1980. He was a German citizen.

Fuhrmann attended primary school in Vienna before progressing to a secondary school. Between 1936 and 1941 he attended a technical university. During the war he undertook his military service before returning to civilian life. By 1947 he was working for Porsche, initially at the Gmünd facility in Austria, later moving to Stuttgart. In 1950 he married his wife Elfriede. That same year he received his Doctorate of Mechanical Engineering for a study of valvetrains in high-speed internal combustion engines.

In 1952/53 he provided significant input to the development of the Porsche Type 547 engine, which became known as the "Fuhrmann engine". This four-cylinder boxer engine has two overhead camshafts per cylinder bank, driven by bevel gears, and a built-up Hirth-type crankshaft.

In 1956 Fuhrmann left Porsche and took over responsibility for development with the car parts company Goetze. In 1962 he was appointed to the board of directors.

Fuhrmann returned to Porsche in 1971 as Technical Director. From 1972 to 1980 he served as Chairman of the board at Porsche, which by then had become a joint-stock (German "Aktiengesellschaft" - (AG)) company. In 1977 he was granted an Honorary Professorship by the Vienna University of Technology.

He was succeeded at Porsche by German-American Peter W. Schutz.

Gallery

External links

Sources and further reading

In German:
 Boschen/Barth: Das große Buch der Porsche-Typen. 2. Auflage, Motorbuch Verlag, Stuttgart 1994, 
 Österreich-Lexikon beim Projekt AEIOU

1918 births
1995 deaths
Porsche people
Businesspeople from Stuttgart
Businesspeople from Vienna
German businesspeople in transport
German military personnel of World War II
Austrian emigrants to Germany